Prince of Persia is a media franchise that started with a series of video games created by Jordan Mechner, and has spawned a large number of games in different platforms, between ports, sequels and spin-offs. The original Prince of Persia game, with its more than 20 platform ports, is one of the most ported games in videogame history

Video games 

Notes
 The Mac OS version of Prince of Persia is included as an unlockable bonus in the GameCube version of The Sands of Time.
 A port of Warrior Within.
 An upscaled re-release of the original Prince of Persia with new remade graphics.
 Mac OS version included as extra in the Wii game The Forgotten Sands, with a remapped control scheme.
 A port of The Two Thrones.
 The PS2 version of The Sands of Time includes the Mac OS version of  Prince of Persia classic game as an unlockable bonus.
 The NTSC Xbox version of The Sands of Time include the Mac OS versions of both Prince of Persia and Prince of Persia 2 classic games as unlockable bonuses.
 The SNES version of Prince of Persia has slightly different level designs with enhanced graphics and 20 levels instead of the original 12, plus several "training" stages.
 HD remasters of The Sands of Time, Warrior Within and The Two Thrones are included in the Prince of Persia Trilogy collection on PS3.
 A VR game developed to be played at escape rooms.
 Originally planned for 2021, the game has been delayed to an unspecified future date.

Mobile games

Notes
 New game with graphics and gameplay based in the original 1989 game, but with different levels.
 Remake of the original 1989 game, with new graphics.
 Port of the Mac OS version of the original game, with the original levels and graphics, designed as a universal title for iPhone, iPod Touch and iPad.
 Port of the PS2 version of Warrior Within, with the same 3D graphics, with separate versions for iPhone and iPad.
 New game which follows the plot of the original but with new 2D graphics and levels, since old feature phones couldn't handle 3D graphics
 Remake of the second game from 1993 with completely different graphics and levels
 Remake of the original 1989 game, with different levels and gameplay mechanics

Film

Graphic novel
Jordan Mechner finished writing the story for a graphic novel in 2007. The novel was written by A.B. Sina, and illustrated by Alex Puvilland and LeUyen Pham. It was released by First Second Books in autumn 2008. The story follows two Princes, jumping between the 9th and 13th centuries. Although it belongs to the franchise the plot is not related to any of the game continuities or that of the 2010 film.

Before the Sandstorm is a 2010 one-shot comic book that serves as both a direct prequel and sequel to the feature film and explains the motives and backgrounds of some characters. It was published by Disney press and written by Mechner with illustrations by Todd McFarlane, Niko Henrichon, David López and Bernard Chang.

Toys

References

Prince of Persia
Prince of Persia